Symmetromphalus is a genus of sea snails, marine gastropod mollusks in the family Neomphalidae.

Species
Species within the genus Symmetromphalus include:

 Symmetromphalus hageni Beck, 1992
 Symmetromphalus regularis McLean, 1990

References

Neomphalidae